The Commissioner of Police (abbreviation: CP) is the top-ranking police officer of the Mauritius Police Force. He is assisted by various holders of the title of Deputy Commissioner of Police. The CP reports to the Home Affairs Division of the Prime Minister's Office.

Commissioner of Police 
 Jacques Ribet (1968-1973)
 Albert Jupin de Fondaumière (1971-1973)
 Jugmohunsing Fulena (1973-1977)
 Atwaroosingh Rajarai (1977-1983)
 Bardwaz Juggernauth (1983-1986) 
 Bhimsen Kowlessur (1986-1991) 
 Cyril Morvan (1991-1994) 
 Raj Dayal (1994-2000) 
 André Feillafé (31 January 2000 – 20 October 2000) 
 Ramanooj Gopalsingh (2000-2008)
 Dhun Iswur Rampersad (2008-2015) 
 Mario Nobin (20 March 2015 – 2 June 2020)
 Khemraj Servansing (3 June 2020 – 2 August 2021)
 Anil Kumar Dip (3 August 2021 – present)

References

Lists of Mauritian people
Police ranks